Chira is a genus of jumping spiders that was first described by George Peckham & Elizabeth Peckham in 1896. It is currently named after Rio Chira, a river in Peru, but the Peckhams originally called the genus Shira, later emended by Eugène Simon.

Species
 it contains thirteen species, found only in South America, Guatemala, and Honduras:
Chira distincta Bauab, 1983 – Brazil
Chira fagei Caporiacco, 1947 – Guyana
Chira flavescens Caporiacco, 1947 – Guyana
Chira gounellei (Simon, 1902) – Brazil, Paraguay, Argentina
Chira guianensis (Taczanowski, 1871) – Peru to Guyana
Chira lanei Soares & Camargo, 1948 – Brazil
Chira lucina Simon, 1902 – Brazil, Guyana
Chira reticulata (Mello-Leitão, 1943) – Brazil
Chira simoni Galiano, 1961 – Brazil, Paraguay
Chira spinosa (Mello-Leitão, 1939) – Honduras to Argentina
Chira thysbe Simon, 1902 – Brazil, Guyana
Chira trivittata (Taczanowski, 1871) (type) – Guatemala to Bolivia
Chira typica (Mello-Leitão, 1930) – Brazil

References

External links 
 Photographs of several Chira species

Salticidae
Salticidae genera
Spiders of Central America
Spiders of South America